Ben is the second studio album by the American singer Michael Jackson, released by Motown Records on August 4, 1972, while Jackson was still a member of the Jackson 5. It received mixed reviews from contemporary music critics. Ben, however, was more successful on the music charts than Jackson's previous studio album, peaking within the top 10 on the Billboard 200 in the United States. Internationally, the album was less successful, peaking at number 12 in Canada, while charting within the top 200 positions in Australia and France.

The album released one single, the title track "Ben", which was a commercial success on the music charts, topping both the US Billboard Hot 100 and the Australian ARIA charts, giving Jackson his first number-one single domestically and internationally. "Ben" also charted within the top 10 in other territories worldwide. "Everybody's Somebody's Fool" was planned to be released as the second single from the album, but was cancelled for unspecified reasons. Two of the album's songs were "stripped" in 2009 as part of the three-disc compilation Hello World: The Motown Solo Collection.

Background
In January 1972, while still a member of the Jackson 5, Jackson released his first studio album, Got to Be There, under Motown Records. The album received generally mixed reviews from contemporary music critics, but was commercially successful worldwide. The album's three singles had a good chart performance on the Billboard Hot 100, with all charting within the top 20 positions on the chart, two peaking within the top 5. Got to Be There was more successful in the U.S. than internationally, peaking at number 14 on the Billboard 200 while peaking at number 37 in the U.K. and number 121 in France.

Music
Recording sessions for Ben began in November 1971, concluding by February 1972 before Jackson's voice began to deepen. It was produced by six people, and executive-produced by Berry Gordy. Songwriters for the 10 tracks of Ben include Mel Larson, Jerry Marcellino, Thom Bell, Linda Creed, The Corporation, Smokey Robinson, and Ronald White, among others. The album's songs have a tempo ranging from 69 beats per minute on "Ben", to 130 on "Shoo-Be-Doo-Be-Doo-Da-Day".

The album's title track, the theme song for the 1972 film of the same name (itself the sequel to the 1971 killer rat film Willard), won a Golden Globe and was nominated for an Academy Award for Best Song, losing to "The Morning After" by Maureen McGovern from another 1972 film, The Poseidon Adventure. "What Goes Around Comes Around" has similarities to Jackson's older brother Jackie's single, "Didn't I (Blow Your Mind This Time)", which featured vocals from Jackson and his older brothers. For Ben, Jackson recorded a cover of The Temptations' 1964 single, "My Girl", a cover of The Stylistics' 1971 hit "People Make The World Go Round", a cover of Lionel Hampton's "Everybody's Somebody's Fool", a cover of Brenda Holloway's 1965 single, "You Can Cry on My Shoulder" and a cover of Stevie Wonder's 1968 single, "Shoo-Be-Doo-Be-Doo-Da-Day". "My Girl" has a funk rhythm and the song's score includes some call-and-response interaction, which is similar to what Jackson and his brothers displayed in their Jackson 5 material. In 1966, the Jackson 5 won a talent show at Gary's Theodore Roosevelt High School, where they performed "My Girl". "You Can Cry on My Shoulder" is a mid-tempo song. "We've Got a Good Thing Going" was previously issued as the B-side to "Got to Be There"s "I Wanna Be Where You Are" and "In Our Small Way" was also featured on Jackson's previous album Got to Be There.

Critical reception

The album generally received mixed to positive reviews from contemporary music critics. Lindsay Planer of Allmusic gave Ben a four out of five-star rating. Planer cited "What Goes Around Comes Around' as being "one of Bens better deep cuts" and "Shoo Be Doo Be Doo Da Day" as being a "winner" while describing "In Our Small Way" as being a "lesser note" for the album, having felt that the song contained a "hopelessly dated 'message'". Planer noted that one "interesting shift was the lack of participation from the Motown hitmaking machine known collectively as 'The Corporation'". Vince Aletti of Rolling Stone magazine gave the album a two out of five star rating. Aletti noted that while the album "contains a good deal more original material"  it "has nothing as luscious as 'Got to Be There' or 'I Wanna Be Where You Are,'" but, "it's on the whole a much stronger album than the first." He noted that in the album's title track, Jackson had a "surprising amount of feeling" in his vocal performance. Leah Greenblatt, of Entertainment Weekly gave the album a "B" grade. Greenblatt commented that Bens title track was a "testament to his talent" and added that the album would "always be defined" by that one song.

Commercial performance
The album was released by Motown Records, Jackson's second studio album for the label as a solo artist, in August 1972. As part of promotion for the album, "Ben" was released as the album's lead and only single in July 1972. "Ben" was a commercial success worldwide, generally charting within the top 10 and top 20 positions on the music charts. The song peaked at number 1 on the Billboard Hot 100, which was Jackson's first, of what would be 13 songs, to top that chart during his career as a solo artist. "Ben" also charted on Billboards Hot Adult Contemporary Tracks and Hot R&B/Hip-Hop Songs at number 3 and 5. "Ben" charted within the top 10 on the Dutch Top 40 chart, peaking at number 2 and number 7 on the U.K. Singles Chart, as well as charting at number 14 in Australia. "Everybody's Somebody's Fool" was planned to be released as the second single from the album, but was cancelled for unspecified reasons.

Ben was more successful on music charts in both the U.S. and worldwide compared to Jackson's previous studio album. The album peaked at number 5 on the U.S. Billboard 200; becoming Jackson's first of what would be six studio albums to peak within the top 10 on that chart. Ben also  peaked at number 4 on the U.S. Top R&B/Hip-Hop Albums chart. On January 13, 1973, Ben debuted on the U.K. Album Chart at its peak position, number 17. The album remained within the country's music chart's top 50 positions for seven consecutive weeks. On January 1, 1974, the album was certified Silver by the British Phonographic Industry for shipping 60,000 units across the U.K. After Jackson's death in June 2009, his music experienced a surge in popularity. The album charted on the French music charts on July 25, 2009, at its peak position of number 162. Ben remained within the country's top 200 positions for two consecutive weeks.

Track listing
Album recorded December 1971 – February 1972, apart from "Ben", recorded November 1971.

Personnel
Adapted from AllMusic.

 Michael Jackson – vocals
 The Corporation – producer
 Hal Davis – producer
 Berry Gordy – executive producer
 Mel Larson – producer
 Jerry Marcellino – producer
 Bobby Taylor – producer

Charts

Weekly charts

Certifications

References

Further reading
 George, Nelson (2004). Michael Jackson: The Ultimate Collection liner notes. Sony BMG.

External links
 

1972 albums
Albums produced by Hal Davis
Albums produced by the Corporation (record production team)
Michael Jackson albums
Motown albums